One Chance in a Million is a 1927 American silent crime film directed by Noel M. Smith and starring William Fairbanks, Viora Daniel and Charles K. French. It was produced by the independent company Gotham Pictures.

Synopsis
After rescuing Ruth Torrence an attractive young heiress from a horse, Jerry Blaine realizes that her fiancée Robert Weston is a thief planning to rob her of her diamonds.

Cast
 William Fairbanks as Jerry Blaine
 Viora Daniel as Ruth Torrence
 Charles K. French as Richard Torrence
 Henry Hebert as Robert Weston 
 Eddie Borden as Horace Featherby
 Duke Martin as Pat Drogan

References

Bibliography
 Connelly, Robert B. The Silents: Silent Feature Films, 1910-36, Volume 40, Issue 2. December Press, 1998.
 Munden, Kenneth White. The American Film Institute Catalog of Motion Pictures Produced in the United States, Part 1. University of California Press, 1997.

External links
 

1927 films
1927 crime films
American silent feature films
American crime films
Films directed by Noel M. Smith
American black-and-white films
Gotham Pictures films
1920s English-language films
1920s American films